Kurt Hinish (born April 27, 1999) is an American football defensive tackle for the Houston Texans of the National Football League (NFL).

Early life and education
Hinish was born on April 27, 1999, and grew up in Pittsburgh, Pennsylvania. He attended Central Catholic High School. As a junior in football, he recorded 32 tackles and helped the team compile a 15–1 record. As a senior in 2016, he made 27 tackles and three sacks, earning first-team all-state honors. He also was named to the Pittsburgh Post-Gazette Fabulous 22 and the Pittsburgh Tribune-Review Terrific 25. He was ranked the eighth-best player in Pennsylvania and the number 26 overall defensive tackle by ESPN.

Hinish committed to the University of Notre Dame in March 2016. He played his first season on their Fighting Irish football team in 2017 and appeared in 13 games, recording eight tackles. In 2018, as a sophomore, Hinish played in all 13 games and made 13 tackles along with 1.5 sacks. The following year, he started every game and registered 15 tackles, two sacks and a forced fumble.

As a senior in 2020, Hinish recorded 19 tackles, 7.5 tackles-for-loss and two sacks in 11 starts. In 2021, he was named team captain and broke the all-time record for most games played by a Notre Dame player. He graduated following the 2021 season and finished his college career with All-Conference honors, 61 games played with 35 starts, 81 tackles, 7.5 sacks, 20  and one forced fumble.

Statistics

Professional career

After going unselected in the 2022 NFL Draft, Hinish was signed by the Houston Texans as an undrafted free agent. He began preseason near the bottom of the depth chart, but worked his way up until he was receiving first-team reps at the end of it. He ended up edging out Ross Blacklock for a spot on the final roster, being one of three undrafted rookies to make the team.

NFL career statistics

References

External links
Notre Dame Fighting Irish bio
Houston Texans bio

1999 births
Living people
American football defensive tackles
Players of American football from Pittsburgh
Notre Dame Fighting Irish football players
Houston Texans players